Beaches: Original Soundtrack Recording is the soundtrack to the Academy Award-nominated 1988 film starring Bette Midler and Barbara Hershey. Midler performs most of the tracks on the album, released on the Atlantic Records label. The album also reunited her with producer Arif Mardin. It features one of Midler's best-known songs, the ballad "Wind Beneath My Wings", which was a number-one hit.

Background
The original script merely indicated that "traditional music" was to be played at certain times. Marc Shaiman, Midler's longtime music arranger, served as music supervisor for the film, and the two of them worked together to determine what songs Midler could sing for the film. Shaiman was already a fan of "Wind Beneath My Wings" and suggested the song to Midler.

Songs
The track that was chosen to promote both the movie and the album was not "Wind Beneath My Wings", but the song heard in the movie's opening scene and also the opening track on the album: Midler's cover of The Drifters' 1960s classic "Under the Boardwalk". That song alluded to the title of the movie and the place where the movie's main characters, rich girl Hillary Whitney (Barbara Hershey) and child performer Cecilia Carol "CC" Bloom (Midler) first meet. Midler's version of "Under the Boardwalk", released to tie in with the premiere in December 1988, peaked outside the Billboard Hot 100 chart and passed by mostly unnoticed, although it reached the Top 30 of the ARIA singles chart in Australia.

"Wind Beneath My Wings", which had been recorded by several other artists before Midler in the early 1980s, among them Sheena Easton, Roger Whittaker, Gary Morris, Perry Como, Gladys Knight & the Pips and Lou Rawls, was released as the second single in February 1989, following the box office success of the movie. The song instantly became a number-one hit on the US singles chart, reached number 2 on the Adult Contemporary chart, number 3 in the UK, number 1 in Australia and was a top 10 hit single in many other parts of the world. Midler's recording of the song was later awarded a platinum disc by the RIAA for sales exceeding one million copies in the US alone. It also won Grammys for Record of the Year and Song of the Year at the Grammy Awards of 1990, and remains Midler's signature tune to this day. The recording of the song appearing in the film is notably different from the one released on the soundtrack, and the movie also includes an orchestral version over the end credits.

The remainder of the soundtrack musically follows C.C. Bloom's rise to fame as an artist, from doing Cole Porter standards like "I've Still Got My Health" to moderately appreciative audiences in dive bars, appearing in burlesque shows singing about the supposed German inventor of the brassiere ("Otto Titsling", a song Midler herself had co-written and which had already appeared on her 1985 album Mud Will Be Flung Tonight), joining an experimental theater group ("Oh Industry"), to becoming a successful pop star ("I Know You by Heart", a duet with David Pack, only briefly heard in the movie) with the right to record material of her own choosing (Randy Newman's "I Think It's Going to Rain Today").

A recurring theme in the movie is Billy Hill's old swing standard "The Glory of Love", first made famous by Benny Goodman in the mid-1930s. In Beaches the song is first reluctantly sung as an upbeat showtune by a very young C.C. Bloom at an audition in the company of her overbearing stage mother. In the final scene the song is performed as a ballad by the character as an adult, and then in the context of the movie taking on an entirely different meaning.

The track "Baby Mine", originally from Walt Disney's 1941 movie Dumbo, was released in two versions with slightly different arrangements; one on the original vinyl album and another on the CD edition.

The version of "Oh Industry" on the soundtrack has a fade out ending, whereas the version in the film features an alternate cold ending.

The only track on the album not to involve Midler is "The Friendship Theme" from the movie's score, composed by Georges Delerue in his only work for a Garry Marshall film.

Commercial performance
The Beaches soundtrack is the best-selling album of Midler's career to date, peaking at number 2 on the Billboard 200 albums chart, number 21 in the UK, number 1 in Australia and eventually achieving triple platinum status in the US for having sold more than three million copies.

Track listing 
Side A
 "Under the Boardwalk" (Artie Resnick, Kenny Young) – 4:18 * Includes uncredited instrumental intro.
 "Wind Beneath My Wings" (Larry Henley, Jeff Silbar) – 4:52
 "I've Still Got My Health" (Cole Porter) – 1:32
 "I Think It's Going to Rain Today" (Randy Newman) – 3:31
 "Otto Titsling" (Bette Midler, Jerry Blatt, Charlene Seeger, Marc Shaiman) – 3:13

Side B
 "I Know You by Heart" (Dean Pitchford, George Merrill, Shannon Rubicam) – 4:40 * Duet with David Pack
 "The Glory of Love" (Billy Hill) – 3:16
 "Baby Mine" (Ned Washington, Frank Churchill) – 2:27 * Note: CD includes alternate version.
 "Oh Industry" (Midler, Wendy Waldman) – 4:06
 "The Friendship Theme" (Georges Delerue) – 1:59 * Instrumental

Personnel
Musicians

 Bette Midler – lead vocals, backing vocals (1–9)
 Angela Cappelli – additional vocals 
 Rachele Cappelli – additional vocals
 Gail Farrell – additional vocals
 Ula Hedwig – additional vocals
 Angie Jaree – additional vocals
 David Lasley – additional vocals
 Marcy Levy – additional vocals
 Melissa Mackay – additional vocals
 Arnold McCuller – additional vocals
 David Pack – lead vocals (6)
 Gene Merlino – additional vocals
 Joe Pizzulo – additional vocals
 Bob Tebow – additional vocals

Production

 Robbie Buchanan – keyboards, synthesizers, arrangements
 Claude Gaudette – acoustic piano, synthesizers, synthesizer programming, drums, percussion, other instruments
 Randy Kerber – acoustic piano, keyboards
 Robbie Kondor – synthesizers, arrangements 
 Steve McNicholas – musician
 Jimmy Rowles – acoustic piano (3)
 Dann Huff – guitars
 Paul Jackson, Jr. – guitars
 Dean Parks – guitars
 Michael Thompson – guitars
 Abraham Laboriel – bass
 Neil Stubenhaus – bass
 Eric Van Essen – bass
 Vinnie Colaiuta – drums
 Luke Cresswell – drum programming
 Paul Leim – drums, percussion
 Joe Mardin – drums
 Carlos Vega – drums
 Gary Coleman – percussion
 Arif Mardin – arrangements
 Marc Shaiman – arrangements, music supervisor 
 Georges Delerue – original scoring (10)
 Endre Granat – concertmaster
 Frank DeCaro – contractor

Production 
 Arif Mardin – producer
 Teri Schwartz – executive producer 
 Jack Joseph Puig – recording, remixing
 Joey Wolpert – recording 
 Ian Eales – additional engineer
 Richard McKernan – additional engineer
 Michael O'Reilly – additional engineer
 Bill Schnee – additional engineer
 Bruce Wildstein – additional engineer
 Frank Wolf – additional engineer
 Ted Blaisdell – assistant engineer
 Ken Felton – assistant engineer
 Ellen Fitton – assistant engineer
 Rob Harvey – assistant engineer
 Wade Jaynes – assistant engineer
 Michael C. Ross – assistant
 Joe Schiff – assistant engineer
 Barton Stevens – assistant engineer
 Doug Sax – mastering

Studios
 Recorded at Schnee Studios (North Hollywood, CA); Ocean Way Recording and Conway Studios (Hollywood, CA); Studio 55 (Los Angeles, CA); Atlantic Studios (New York, NY).
 Mixed and Mastered at The Mastering Lab (Hollywood, CA).

Charts

Weekly charts

Year-end charts

Certifications

References 

Albums produced by Arif Mardin
Bette Midler soundtracks
1988 soundtrack albums
Atlantic Records soundtracks
Comedy film soundtracks
Drama film soundtracks